Thrincophora stenoptycha is a moth of the  family Tortricidae. It is found in Australia (including Queensland).

The wingspan is about 20 mm. The forewings are whitish with uneven fuscous irroration and strigulation and with dark fuscous markings. The hindwings are pale grey.

References

Moths described in 1926
Archipini